Bukaiši Parish is an administrative unit of Dobele Municipality in the Semigallia region of Latvia. At the beginning of 2014, the population of the parish was 745. The administrative center is Bukaiši village.

Towns, villages and settlements of Bukaiši parish 
 Bukaiši
 Kārklumuiža
 Medne
 Rociņas

References 

Parishes of Latvia
Dobele Municipality
Semigallia